Turtle Lake Township is a township in Beltrami County, Minnesota, United States. The population was 1,195 as of the 2010 census.

History
This township took its name from Turtle Lake.

Geography

Unincorporated towns
 Werner at 
(This list is based on USGS data and may include former settlements.)

Lakes
 Bailey Lake
 Lake Beltrami (west three-quarters)
 Black Lake
 Campbell Lake (east edge)
 Crane Lake (south three-quarters)
 Fox Lake
 Horseman Lake
 Larson Lake
 Lingren Lake
 Little Turtle Lake
 Lake Julia (south half)
 Movil Lake (north three-quarters)
 Range Line Lake (vast majority)
 Rice Lake
 Silver Lake
 Three Island Lake (west half)
 Turtle Lake

Adjacent townships
 Durand Township (north)
 Hagali Township (northeast)
 Port Hope Township (east)
 Turtle River Township (southeast)
 Northern Township (south)
 Eckles Township (southwest)
 Liberty Township (west)

Cemeteries
The township contains Turtle Lake Cemetery.

Demographics
As of the census of 2000, there were 1,122 people, 429 households, and 343 families residing in the township. There were 570 housing units at an average density of 19.9/sq mi (7.7/km). The racial makeup of the township was 95.10% White, 0.18% African American, 2.05% Native American, 0.80% Asian, 0.09% from other races, and 1.78% from two or more races. Hispanic or Latino of any race were 0.27% of the population.

There were 429 households, out of which 33.6% had children under the age of 18 living with them, 71.8% were married couples living together, 3.5% had a female householder with no husband present, and 20.0% were non-families. 16.6% of all households were made up of individuals, and 5.1% had someone living alone who was 65 years of age or older.  The average household size was 2.60 and the average family size was 2.91.

In the township the population was spread out, with 25.8% under the age of 18, 4.4% from 18 to 24, 25.7% from 25 to 44, 31.9% from 45 to 64, and 12.2% who were 65 years of age or older.  The median age was 42 years. For every 100 females, there were 104.4 males.  For every 100 females age 18 and over, there were 108.5 males.

The median income for a household in the township was $52,857, and the median income for a family was $59,500. Males had a median income of $36,964 versus $26,731 for females. The per capita income for the township was $23,770.  About 3.1% of families and 6.6% of the population were below the poverty line, including 7.0% of those under age 18 and 10.7% of those age 65 or over.

References
 United States National Atlas
 United States Census Bureau 2007 TIGER/Line Shapefiles
 United States Board on Geographic Names (GNIS)

External links
Turtle Lake Township official website

Townships in Beltrami County, Minnesota
Townships in Minnesota